Snowdonia Slate Trail is a long distance footpath, running  as a circular route around Northern Snowdonia through the UK`s latest World Heritage Site, starting from Bangor. It passes through the main areas and heritage sites associated with the slate industry, and also through some of its major landscapes.

The route also passes close to several narrow-gauge railways, mostly linked to the slate industry, namely the Penrhyn Quarry Railway, Llanberis Lake Railway, Snowdon Mountain Railway, the Welsh Highland Railway and the Ffestiniog Railway.

It is possible to do the trail in seven days using public transport based in Caernarfon or Bangor.  

An ultra marathon used to be organised around the entire trail each year.

The route 
The trail is arranged in 13 sections, ranging in length from 3 to 11 miles:

(Distances, ascent and time are taken from the website.)

 Section 1 - Bangor to Bethesda - (Distance: 10.2KM, 6.3MLS ; Ascent: 325M, 1050FT ; Time: 3 – 4hrs)
 Section 2 - Bethesda to Llanberis - (Distance: 11.6KM, 7.2MLS ; Ascent: 360M, 1200FT ; Time: 3 – 4hrs)
 Section 3 - Llanberis to Waunfawr - (Distance: 6.1KM, 3.8MLS ; Ascent: 310M, 1000FT ; Time: 2 – 3hrs)
 Section 4 - Waunfawr to Nantlle - (Distance: 9.5KM, 5.9MLS ; Ascent: 270M, 900FT ; Time: 3 – 4hrs)
 Section 5 - Nantlle to Rhyd Ddu - (Distance: 8.2KM, 5.1MLS ; Ascent: 260M, 850FT ; Time: 2 – 3hrs)
 Section 6 - Rhyd Ddu to Beddgelert - (Distance: 8.4KM, 5.2MLS ; Ascent: 110M, 350FT ; Time: 1.5 – 2.5hrs)
 Section 7 - Beddgelert to Croesor - (Distance: 7.2KM, 4.4MLS ; Ascent: 400M, 1300FT ; Time: 2 – 3hrs)
 Section 8 - Croesor to Tanygrisiau - (Distance: 7.4KM, 4.6MLS ; Ascent: 470M, 1550FT ; Time: 3 - 4hrs)
 Section 9 - Tanygrisiau to Llan Ffestiniog - (Distance: 8.6KM, 5.4MLS ; Ascent: 250M, 850FT ; Time: 2.5 – 3.5hrs)
 Section 10 - Llan Ffestiniog to Penmachno - (Distance: 21.3KM, 13.2MLS ; Ascent: 880M, 2850FT ; Time: 8 – 9hrs)
 Section 11 - Penamchno to Betws y Coed - (Distance: 8.6KM, 5.3MLS ; Ascent: 150M, 500FT ; Time: 2 – 3hrs)
 Section 12 - Betws y Coed to Capel Curig - (Distance: 9.5KM, 5.9MLS ; Ascent: 420M, 1350FT ; Time: 3 – 4hrs)
 Section 13 - Capel Curig to Bethesda - (Distance: 17.6KM, 11.0MLS ; Ascent: 150M, 500FT ; Time: 5 – 6hrs)

Bangor to Bethesda (in progress) 
The Bangor to Bethesda leg of the Snowdonia Slate Trail  provides easy walking as the mountains are approached.

Porth Penrhyn 
In the early days of slate quarrying, slate was shipped out from Aber Ogwen, the estuary of the river Ogwen, a few miles east of Bangor. This estuary was shallow and the smaller boats had a limited carrying capacity of some sixty tons. This constraint was overcome when, in 1790, Lord Penrhyn built Port Penrhyn on the river Cegin estuary. Penrhyn quarry operated its own fleet of slate-carrying ships.

Although a smaller operation at the port produced 133,000 school writing slates back in 1778, a factory was established in 1798 to mass produce such slates.

Penrhyn Quarry Railway 
The Penrhyn Quarry Railway first opened in 1798 as the Llandegai Tramway. It became the Penrhyn Railway in 1801 although on a different route.

Constructed to transport slate from Lord Penrhyn`s slate quarries at Bethesda to Port Penrhyn, the new railway was around six miles long and used a gauge of 1 ft 10.75 in.

It was one of the oldest narrow gauge railways in the world and closed in 1962. Its engines were dispersed: Blanche and Linda now run on the Ffestiniog Railway and Charles is on show in Penrhyn Castle.

Penrhyn Castle 
Penrhyn Castle was built between 1820 and 1833 for George Hay Dawkins Pennant by the famous architect, Thomas Hopper.

Known for his unorthodox style, Hopper opted not to follow the fashion for Gothic architecture. He went against the grain, choosing a neo-Norman design. Hopper’s hands-on approach also meant he oversaw the designing and building of the castle’s furniture, made by local craftsmen.

In 1840, with the castle finished, George Hay Dawkins Pennant died. His daughter, Juliana, inherited Penrhyn. She, in turn, married Edward Gordon Douglas, who later became the 1st Lord Penrhyn of Llandegai.

Cochwillan Mill 
This mill treated wool for textiles and used sulphuric acid, which polluted the river Ogwen and poisoned the fish. This was not to Lord Penrhyn`s liking so he bought it and converted it into a corn mill. It closed in 1955 and became the home of Mr Vernon Barker – a  woodworker who made furniture. He built the mill wheel, which was so finely balanced that the cat would turn it with its paw.

Llanllechid Church 
The Church of St Llechid is a Grade II listed building. It was built to replace a much earlier 15th century church, the building dates from 1844.

Llechid was a 6th-century saint of Wales. Born about 556 AD in Brittany, she was the child of Ithel Hael de Cornouaille and an unknown mother. Her family moved to Wales, where many of her siblings founded churches. She is the Patron Saint of Llanllechid , where she built a Church and where a holy well (now lost) was attributed to her.

There is a legend relating the building of the original St. Llechid’s Church and the following account of it comes from Elias Owen’s ‘Welsh folk-lore: a collection of the folk-tales and legends of North Wales’ (1887)

There was a tradition extant in the parish of Llanllechid, near Bangor, Carnarvonshire, that it was intended to build a church in a field called Cae’r Capel, not far from Plasuchaf Farm, but it was found the next morning that the labours of the previous day had been destroyed, and that the materials had been transported in the night to the site of the present church. The workmen, however, carried them all back again, and resumed their labours at Cae’r Capel, but in vain, for the next day they found their work undone, and the wood, stones, etc., in the place where they had found them when their work was first tampered with. Seeing that it was useless fighting against a superior power, they desisted, and erected the building on the spot indicated by the destroyers of their labours.

Penrhyn Quarry 
At the end of the nineteenth century, this was the world’s largest slate quarry; the main pit is nearly 1 mile (1.6 km) long and 1,200 feet (370 metres) deep, and it was worked by nearly 3,000 quarrymen. Penrhyn is still Britain’s largest slate quarry but its workforce is now nearer 200.

The quarry holds a significant place in the history of the British Labour Movement as the site of two prolonged strikes by workers demanding better pay and safer conditions. The first strike lasted eleven months in 1896. The second began in 1900 and lasted for three years. Known as “The Great Strike of Penrhyn” this was the longest dispute in British industrial history. From 1964 until 2007 it was owned and operated by Alfred McAlpine PLC.

In 2007 it was purchased by Kevin Lagan (an Irish businessman and the owner and chairman of the Lagan Group) and renamed Welsh Slate Ltd which also includes the Oakeley quarry in Blaenau Ffestiniog, the Cwt Y Bugail quarry and the Pen Yr Orsedd quarry.

Bethesda 
Bethesda is the first significant centre of civilisation encountered on this walk, with shops, cafés and pubs.

References

External links 
 

Long-distance footpaths in Wales